The 1972 Australian Formula 2 Championship was a CAMS sanctioned Australian motor racing title open to racing cars complying with Australian Formula 2. It was the sixth Australian Formula 2 Championship. The title was won by Larry Perkins driving an Elfin 600B/E Ford.

Calendar
The championship was contested over a seven round series with one race per round.

Note: Rounds 3, 5, 6 & 7 were each run concurrently with rounds of the 1972 Australian Drivers' Championship.

Points system
Championship points were awarded on a 9-6-4-3-2-1 basis to the first six placegetters.

Championship results

References

External links
  Image of 1972 AF2 Champion Larry Perkins (Elfin 600B/E) at Symmons Plains

Australian Formula 2 Championship
Formula 2 Championship